Vanisar (also Romanized as Vanīsar and Vaneysar; also known as Vanesar, Vanisard, and Vintser) is a village in Dast Jerdeh Rural District, Chavarzaq District, Tarom County, Zanjan Province, Iran. At the 2006 census, its population was 1,101, in 269 families.

References 

Populated places in Tarom County